The canton of Mézenc is an administrative division of the Haute-Loire department, south-central France. It was created at the French canton reorganisation which came into effect in March 2015. Its seat is in Le Chambon-sur-Lignon.

It consists of the following communes:
 
Alleyrac
Chadron
Le Chambon-sur-Lignon
Champclause
Chaudeyrolles
Les Estables
Fay-sur-Lignon
Freycenet-la-Cuche
Freycenet-la-Tour
Goudet
Lantriac
Laussonne
Mazet-Saint-Voy
Le Monastier-sur-Gazeille
Montusclat
Moudeyres
Présailles
Saint-Front
Saint-Martin-de-Fugères
Salettes
Les Vastres

References

Cantons of Haute-Loire